Elizabeth M. Celi is an Australian psychologist and author in men's health, with expertise in men's mental health and domestic abuse. While continuing private practice as a trauma focused therapist, Elizabeth also works as a leadership coach and consultant to the film industry.  She is the sole author of two published books and co-author of six scientific peer reviewed papers. Two more research papers are currently in review.

Education
Celi gained her bachelor's degree in 1996 with first class Honours in 1997 from Swinburne University of Technology, where she majored in psychology and psychophysiology. In 2003, she obtained her Ph.D. from the Department of Psychiatry at The University of Melbourne.

Celi went on to complete studies and obtain qualifications in screenwriting with Screenwriters University 2014–2016, documentary production at the American University of Rome in 2015 and Diploma in Screen and Media (Filmmaking) in 2018 from the New York Film Academy.

Career
Celi was the founding director of Elements Integrated Health Consulting, working as a psychologist and mentor with both men and women, including male victims of domestic abuse. Having managed four private practice consultancies as a psychologist in inner city Melbourne and the Mornington Peninsula, Celi commenced online consults in 2014. Celi now offers in person and Telehealth consultations for mental health concerns and trauma-focused therapy.

Celi is a past member of the board of directors of the Australian Psychological Society. She is an ongoing Member of the Australian Psychological Society, the Trauma Recovery Network Australia and the EMDR Association of Australia.

Celi was a media commentator on men's mental health, interviewed about male victims and female perpetrators of intimate partner abuse and violence by the Brisbane Times, the West Australian, The Herald, The Advertiser, ABC News, and The Sydney Morning Herald. She appeared on 9am with David & Kim for three segments discussing men's mental health matters.

Celi has noted that men express their emotions differently. Gaining understanding of how this shows itself, for both men and women, has been the primary focus of her two published books and media advocacy. Many men and women have shared how they have benefitted in their personal and professional relationships after reviewing Celi's books and media.

During the development of Australia's first National Men's Health Policy, Celi was invited to advise the Senate Select Committee on Men's Health, and subsequently invited to advise the Senate inquiry on domestic violence in 2014.

Publications

Books

Scientific articles

See also
 Men's health
 Men's health in Australia

References

External links

Leadership coaching

Psychotherapists
Family therapists
Anti-domestic violence activists
20th-century Australian non-fiction writers
Australian women writers
Self-help writers
Living people
Year of birth missing (living people)
20th-century Australian women